Ric Lewis is a British businessman. He is a founding partner of Tristan Capital Partners, a British property investment firm, and its predecessor, Curzon Global Partners (1998–2008). He is also the founder and chairman of a registered charity, The Black Heart Foundation. He ranked first in the Powerlist 2019, an annual list of the UK's most influential people with African or Afro-Caribbean heritage.

Early life and career
Ric Lewis (born December 1962) was born in Salem, Massachusetts to African American parents. His father was chief of the local fire department and his mother worked for a local telecommunications company. Lewis attended public high school, was class president and at 6'10" also played on the basketball team. After high school, he attended Dartmouth College to study Spanish and Economics and later Harvard Business School.

Lewis was a partner and senior managing director of AEW Capital Management, a Boston investment management business, where he led the company’s expansion into Europe and moved to London in 1998.

After emigrating to the United Kingdom to found Curzon Global Partners, a property investment company that was a part of AEW  he left AEW to become a founding partner of another London property investment company, Tristan Capital Partners, in 2009. By 2019 Tristan Capital Partners was the largest black-owned business in the UK, with over £14billion under management in the investment firm.

Lewis is involved in a number of advocacy and charitable projects. He is the Chairman of UK/US registered charity the Black Heart Foundation, which he founded in 2009. The Foundation is dedicated to supporting initiatives that improve educational benefits for under-resourced young people and providing opportunity to those who are otherwise denied it. Each year, it provides several educational scholarships to young people in need in the UK and abroad. At present, the Foundation has awarded over 550 Black Heart Scholarships at over 130 different, universities, schools, alternative academic institutions and training programmes throughout the UK and US. In addition, he is chairman of the Institute of Imagination (London Children's Museum), and a trustee of the Royal National Children's Foundation. He is governor of Ark King Solomon Academy, and a patron of Eastside Young Leaders Academy. He was a trustee of Teach First and of International Inspiration, and a director of London First and the London Regional Council of The Prince’s Trust.

In the United States he is a trustee of Dartmouth College and is on the board of visitors for the Belfer Center for Science and International Affairs at Harvard University. He served as Board of Visitors, Rockefeller Center for International and Public Policy, Dartmouth College; Board Director, Boys & Girls Club of Boston; Board Director, I Have a Dream, Boston; Board Director, International House of Blues Foundation; Trustee, Hyams Foundation Inc.; Overseer, The Judge Baker Children’s Center, Boston and Non-Executive Director, Innovision LLC

He was a director of Grassroot Soccer in South Africa, and of the Smurfit School of Business of University College Dublin.

In June 2020, the Board of Legal & General Group announced Lewis’ appointment as an independent non-executive director.

As of October, 2020, Lewis was taking part in a 12-week financial podcast, 'The Mentor', where he had teamed up with David Whitely to mentor three young people. Each of the young people gets £5000 and an hour per week with Lewis. The Mentor is a non-profit podcast and all funds raised go to the Black Heart Foundation.

In February 2021, Lewis was awarded the Urban Land Institute (ULI) European Leader Award for his contribution to urban development and real estate, along with his civic and social endeavours as part of the Black Heart Foundation.

Recognition

 Powerlist 2019 - First Place, in addition, Lewis was ranked second in the Powerlist 2018 and 2017.
10th PERE Global Awards, Industry Figure of the Year: Europe.
 Boston Jaycees Ten Outstanding Young Leaders Award (1998).
2021 Urban Land Institute (ULI) European Leader Award.

References

Living people
British businesspeople
1962 births
Dartmouth College alumni
Harvard Business School alumni
People from Salem, Massachusetts